Lodz Ghetto mark was a surrogate currency that circulated in the Lodz Ghetto in 1940—1944 until the Ghetto was liquidated in August 1944. It was divided into 100 pfennig. The notes had no value outside the Ghetto, and could not be exchanged into other currencies.

Special ghetto currency 

When the ghetto was created, its inhabitants were forced to exchange their cash and valuables for the ghetto mark. Other large ghettos in Poland adopted a different approach: they were allowed to use banknotes of the Polish zloty and small denominations of the German Reichsmark with unique stamps indicating that this currency can only be used in the ghetto. This was an effective way to strip ghetto residents of their possessions while preventing them from fleeing. Outside of Poland, only the Terezin Ghetto is known to have used its own surrogate currency.

The earliest 10 pfennig coins' design strongly resembled the Reichspfennig of the Third Reich, and the occupation authorities demanded a new design. Further coins were designed by Morduch Glazer (1890–1950).

The initial design of the banknotes was proposed by Wincenty Brauner, a member of the pre-war art group Jung Jidysz, and featured a man breaking apart his chains; this design was rejected by German authorities. The final design was developed by Ignacy Gutman, head of the Ghetto's construction department: it featured a Menorah and a Star of David in the corner. Printing forms for coins were engraved by Pinkus Szwarc.

Order # 70 of June 24, 1940, was issued by Chaim Rumkowski, and urged Ghetto residents to exchange their money into the Ghetto marks. The use of other money in the Ghetto was punishable by death penalty.

Coins 
 Coins were issued in the following denominations: 10 pfennig, 5, 10 and 20 mark.

Banknotes 

 Notes were issued in the following denominations: 50 pfennig, 1, 2, 5, 10, 20 and 50 mark.

References

External links 
 A brief history of the ghetto notes and further links
 
 

Łódź Ghetto
Currencies of Poland
Mark (currency)